The prime minister of Iceland is Iceland's head of government. The prime minister is appointed formally by the president and exercises executive authority along with the cabinet subject to parliamentary support.

Constitutional basis
The prime minister is appointed by the president under the Constitution of Iceland, Section II Article 17, and chairs the Cabinet of Iceland:

 
 The [cabinet] meetings shall be presided over by the Minister called upon by the President of the Republic to do so, who is designated Prime Minister.

Locations
The prime minister's office is located in Stjórnarráðið, Reykjavik, where their secretariat is based and where cabinet meetings are held. The prime minister has a summer residence, Þingvallabær in Þingvellir. The prime minister also has a reception house at Tjarnargata, Reykjavik, which was the prime ministerial residence until 1943.

List of previous prime ministers

Home Rule (1904–1918)

Political party:

Kingdom (1918–1944)

Political party:

Republic (1944–present)

Political party:

Timeline

See also

List of rulers of Iceland
 Cabinet of Iceland

References

External links
Iceland's Prime Ministers Office

 
Iceland
Political history of Iceland
Lists of political office-holders in Iceland
1904 establishments in Iceland